A dale is a valley.  It was commonly used in northern England and Scotland to denote an open valley as a dale, contrasted with a gill or narrow valley.

List of places
Places where dale is part of the name, but not the entire common name:

United Kingdom

England

Ainsdale, England
Airedale, England
Allendale, England
Birkdale, England
Darley Dale, England
Denby Dale, England
Derbyshire Dales, England
Eskdale, England
Glossopdale, England
Lathkill Dale, England
Langstrothdale, England
Nidderdale, England
Rochdale, England
Rossendale, England
Skelmersdale, England
 Slatepit Dale, England
Teesdale, England
Two Dales, England

Scotland
Achrimsdale
Allandale
Allasdale
Armadale, Skye
Armadale, Sutherland
Annandale (disambiguation)
Arnisdale
Attadale
Bernisdale
Berriedale
Borrodale
Bracadale
Carradale
Cleadale
Clydesdale
Cromdale
Eorodale
Eskdale
Galmisdale
Glenborrodale
Glendale
Grigadale
Helmsdale
Lauderdale
Laxdale
Liddesdale
Moffatdale
Nithsdale, Scotland
North Erradale
Sordale
South Erradale
Spinningdale
Strath Halladale
Suladale
Swordale
Talladale
Teviotdale
Torrisdale
Tweeddale
West Helmsdale
Westerdale, Highland
Weydale

United States
Allendale, New Jersey
Annandale, Virginia
Avondale (disambiguation)
Bardsdale, California
Bluffdale, Utah
Carbondale, Illinois
Cooperdale, Ohio
Dale City, Virginia
Farmingdale, New York
Faunsdale, Alabama
Forestdale (disambiguation)
Fultondale, Alabama
Gardendale (disambiguation)
Glendale (disambiguation)
Hartsdale, New York
 Hillsdale, New Jersey
Hillsdale, Portland, Oregon
Hinsdale, Illinois
Irondale (disambiguation)
Knightdale, North Carolina
Lauderdale (disambiguation)
Lindale, Texas
Mountaindale, Oregon
North Grosvenor Dale, Connecticut
Oakdale, New York
Oildale, California
Palmdale (disambiguation)
Parkdale (disambiguation)
Parksdale, California
Pinedale (disambiguation)
Pleasant Dale, Nebraska
Riverdale, New York
Robertsdale, Alabama
Robbinsdale, Minnesota
Rockdale, Texas
Rosedale, New York
Rosendale, New York
Roslindale, Massachusetts
Scarsdale, New York
Scottdale, Georgia
Scottdale, Pennsylvania
Scottsdale, Arizona
Silverdale, Pennsylvania
Summerdale (disambiguation)
Thorndale, Pennsylvania
Urbandale, Iowa
Weirsdale, Florida

Australia
Evandale, Tasmania
Scottsdale, Tasmania
Bairnsdale, Victoria 
Jarrahdale, Western Australia
Bedfordale, Western Australia
Armadale, Western Australia
Armidale
Axedale, Victoria
Strathdale, Victoria

New Zealand
Avondale, Auckland
Birkdale, Auckland
Edendale, Southland region
Rosedale, Auckland
Silverdale, Auckland
Silverdale, Hamilton
Taradale, Hawke's Bay region

Canada
Armdale, Nova Scotia
Coaldale, Alberta
Cloverdale, British Columbia
Nickeldale, Ontario
Parkdale, Ontario
Pinedale, Alberta
Rexdale, Ontario
Rosedale, Ontario
Silverdale, British Columbia
Thorndale, Ontario
Vegandale, Ontario

Multiple regions
 Avondale (disambiguation)
 Lawndale (disambiguation)
 Rosedale (disambiguation)

See also
 Dell (landform)
 Dale (disambiguation)

Suffixes
Place name element etymologies
English suffixes

de:Dale